P32 may refer to:

Aircraft 
 Boeing XP-32, a proposed American fighter
 Boulton Paul P.32, a British prototype night bomber 
 Piaggio P.32, an Italian medium bomber

Other uses 
 , a submarine of the Royal Navy
 Husky Haven Airport, in Montrose, Pennsylvania, United States
 Kel-Tec P-32, a pistol
 , a patrol boat of the Seychelles Coast Guard 
 Lomwe language
 Papyrus 32, biblical manuscript
 Phosphorus-32, an isotope of phosphorus